This is a list of people associated with Syracuse University, including founders, financial benefactors, notable alumni, notable educators, and speakers. Syracuse University has over 250,000 alumni representing all 50 states, the District of Columbia, and more than 170 countries and territories.

Founders 

Jesse Truesdell Peck – first chairman of the university's board of trustees
George F. Comstock
George L. Taylor
Charles Andrews

Notable Benefactors 

John Dustin Archbold – oil
Andrew Carnegie – steel
George F. Comstock  –real estate
Joseph Lubin – real estate
Donald Newhouse – publishing
Samuel Irving Newhouse, Sr. – publishing
Samuel Irving Newhouse, Jr. – publishing
Eliphalet Remington – firearm
Margaret Olivia Slocum Sage – philanthropist
Lyman Cornelius Smith – firearm and typewriter magnate
Thomas J. Watson – IBM
Martin J. Whitman – investment advisor

Notable alumni

Arts and letters

Nilo Alcala – composer, first Philippine-born recipient of the Aaron Copland House Residency Award and a Los Angeles Master Chorale commission
Julia Alvarez – poet, novelist, and essayist
Donna Alvermann – prominent professor and researcher in adolescent and media literacies
Joe Amato – author
Robb Armstrong – cartoonist of the comic strip Jump Start
Brad Anderson – cartoonist of the comic strip Marmaduke
Maltbie D. Babcock – 19th century clergyman and author
Harriete Estel Berman – artist 
Nydia Blas – photographer
James Bishop – painter
Joel Brouwer – poet, educator, and journalist
Gordon Chandler – sculptor
Wendy Coakley-Thompson – novelist
Stephen Crane – novelist; stayed only one semester, later admitting he came "more to play baseball than to study."
Virginia Cuthbert – artist
Mabel Potter Daggett – journalist and suffragist
Aleš Debeljak – poet, essayist and sociologist
Stephen Dunn – poet, winner of the 2001 Pulitzer Prize for Poetry
Birgitta Moran Farmer – painter, winner of 1906 Hiram Gee Award in Painting
Frances Farrand Dodge – watercolorist and landscape artist 
Paul Finkelman – historian
Moses Finley – historian
Carlisle Floyd – opera composer
Whitney Gaskell – novelist
Sharon Gold – artist and professor
William Pratt Graham – sixth chancellor of Syracuse University
Clement Greenberg – art critic
Henry Grethel – fashion designer
Beth Gylys – poet and professor
Beth Harrington – filmmaker and musician
Michael Herr – writer and war correspondent
Susan Joy Hassol – science communicator
Morton L. Janklow – literary agent
Shirley Jackson – novelist
Betsey Johnson – fashion designer
David N. Johnson – composer, organist, and professor
Joseph S. Kozlowski – portrait artist
Hilton Kramer – critic, "The Revenge of the Philistines"
Barbara Kruger – collage artist
Sol LeWitt – sculptor
James F. Light – literary scholar
Mark Lombardi – abstract painter
Jenni Lukac – contemporary artist
John D. MacDonald – novelist
Don Maloney – Japanophile author
Barry N. Malzberg – science fiction writer
Jerre Mangione – novelist, and scholar of the Italian-American experience
Robert Mankoff – cartoonist and editor of The New Yorker
Donald Martino – Pulitzer Prize-winning composer
Clifton E. Marsh – historian of the African diaspora
Scott McCloud – cartoonist and comics theorist
Jay McInerney – novelist
Joyce Carol Oates – novelist
Robert O'Connor – novelist
Tom Perrotta – novelist and screenwriter
John Pfahl – photographer and professor
Salvador Plascencia – novelist
Kim Ponders – novelist 
William Powhida – artist
Mary Jo Putney – romance novelist
Jim Ridlon – sports painter and sculptor, also a former professional football player 
M. J. Rose – author and book marketing executive
William Safire – Pulitzer Prize-winning commentator and former New York Times columnist
George Saunders – short-story writer
Alice Sebold – novelist
Laurie Gwen Shapiro – novelist, director, Independent Spirit Award for Keep the River on Your Right: A Modern Cannibal Tale
Esther Baker Steele – educator, author, traveler, philanthropist
Anthony Veasna So – Cambodian-American short story writer
Cheryl Strayed – novelist, memoirist, and essayist
Elizabeth Strout – novelist
William Tester – short story writer
Dorothy Thompson – journalist
Jack Tippit – cartoonist
Ada Josephine Todd – author and educator
Lori Weitzner – textile designer
Stephanie Welsh – Pulitzer prize winning photographer turned midwife
Ryan Van Winkle – poet
Irene Vilar – author and literary agent
Kate Vrijmoet – artist
John A. Williams – novelist
Howard Wyeth – drummer and pianist

Education

Molly Corbett Broad – President, American Council on Education
Walter Broadnax – President, Clark Atlanta University
George Campbell Jr. – former President, Cooper Union
Mary Schmidt Campbell – President, Spelman College
Kent John Chabotar – President, Guilford College
R. Inslee Clark, Jr. – Director of Admissions, Yale College
Michael Crow – President, Arizona State University
Mark Emmert – President, University of Washington
Paul Finkelman – President, Gratz College
Welthy Honsinger Fisher – Founder, World Education and World Literacy Canada.
 A. Lee Fritschler – former President, Dickinson College (MPA'60 & PhD '65)
Jonathan Gibralter – President, State University of New York at Farmingdale
Shelley Haley – Professor of Classics and Africana Studies, Hamilton College
Kermit L. Hall – former president, State University of New York at Albany, Utah State University
Alice Ilchman – President, Sarah Lawrence College
David Knapp – President, University of Massachusetts
Barry Mills – President, Bowdoin College
Sean O'Keefe – former Chancellor, Louisiana State University (LSU)
L. Jay Oliva – former president, New York University
Joseph Rallo – President, Angelo State University
Mark Reckase – University Distinguished Professor Emeritus, Michigan State University
Kenneth P. Ruscio – President, Washington and Lee University
Donna Shalala – President, University of Miami
Deborah F. Stanley – President, State University of New York at Oswego
Mitchel Wallerstein – President, Baruch College

Investors, industrialists, and executives

P.O. Ackley – world-renowned Gunsmith, CEO, P.O. Ackley Inc.
Daniel A. D'Aniello – co-founder and chairman, The Carlyle Group
Ben Baldanza – airline executive and former CEO of Spirit Airlines
Al-Waleed bin Talal – founder and President, Kingdom Holding Co
William J. Brodsky – chairman and chief executive officer of the Chicago Board Options Exchange
 Stanley Chais (1926–2010) – investment advisor in the Madoff investment scandal
Dennis Crowley – co-founder, Foursquare (service)
Mary C. Daly - President and chief executive officer of the Federal Reserve Bank of San Francisco 
Nick Donofrio – Senior Vice President, Technology & Manufacturing, IBM
Bernard Goldberg (1948) – Co-founder of Raymour & Flanigan
William James – Director, Lazard Freres & Company
E. Floyd Kvamme – Partner Emeritus; Kleiner, Perkins, Caufield & Byers.  Chairman, Presidents Council of Advisors on Science and Technology under President George W Bush
Jeff McCormick – founder, Saturn Partners, and Independent candidate for governor in the Massachusetts gubernatorial election, 2014
Richard Menschel – (retired) senior director of Goldman Sachs, philanthropist.
Robert Menschel – (retired) legendary senior director of Goldman Sachs, philanthropist, created Wall Street's first institutional department.
Sean O'Keefe – former Chairman of Airbus Group, Inc.
Lowell W. Paxson – founder of Home Shopping Network
Kirthiga Reddy – former MD of Facebook India.
Arthur Rock – venture capitalist, cofounder of Intel and father figure to Apple founder Steve Jobs
Vishal Sikka – CEO & MD (Designate) Infosys Ltd.
Abhay Vakil – Indian businessman & non-executive director of Asian Paints Ltd
Martin J. Whitman – founder, Co-Chief Investment Officer, Third Avenue Value Fund

Hospitality, real estate, construction, and architecture
 Dean Alvord – developer known best for developing Belle Terre, New York, Prospect Park South, and Roslyn Estates, New York.
Harley Baldwin – developer in Aspen, Colorado
 Thomas Wilson Boyde Jr. (1905–1981), American architect, first Black architect in Rochester, New York
 Arthur Bridgman Clark – architect, professor, first head of the Art Department at Stanford University
 Thom Filicia – interior designer, author, television host
 Bruce Fowle – architect, Fox & Fowle Architects
 James Garrison – architect, Garrison Architects 
 Adam Gross – architect, Ayers Saint Gross
 Wilbur R. Ingalls, Jr. – architect
 Lorimer Rich – architect, designed the Tomb of the Unknowns in Washington, DC and the Tomb of the Unknown Revolutionary War Soldier in Rome, NY
 David Rockwell – founder and CEO, Rockwell Group
 Steve Rubell – former Studio 54 club owner
 Ian Schrager – hotelier and former Studio 54 club owner
 Werner Seligmann – architect
 Thom Filicia – interior designer, author, television host

Law and public service

Bob Antonacci – former NYS Senate Member, NYS Supreme Court Judge
 Andrew P. Bakaj – U.S. Attorney and lead counsel for the Whisteblower during the Impeachment Inquiry and the subsequent Impeachment of President Donald Trump.
Craig Benson – former New Hampshire Governor
Joe Biden – 46th President of the United States, 47th Vice President of the United States, U.S. Senator from Delaware, Chairman of the U.S. Senate Committee on Foreign Relations
Beau Biden – former Attorney General of Delaware, son of Joe Biden
Dave Bing – former Mayor of Detroit, NBA Hall of Famer
Carolyn Bourdeaux – Member of the U.S. House of Representatives from Georgia's 7th district
Jon Bramnick – current New Jersey Assembly Minority Leader
Angus Cameron – former Senator from Wisconsin
Gary Chan – Member of Legislative Council of Hong Kong since 2008
George Fletcher Chandler – first Superintendent of the New York State Police 
John T. Connor – former US Secretary of Commerce
David Crane – former Chief Prosecutor of the Special Court for Sierra Leone
Al D'Amato – former Senator from New York
Willy De Clercq – former European Commissioner for Trade and External Relations, former Belgian Minister of Finance, Foreign Trade, and Budget; former Belgian Deputy Prime Minister
John A. DeFrancisco – New York State Senator
Robert Duffy – Mayor of Rochester, New York, Lt. Governor, New York State
Kwabena Dufuor – Finance Minister of Ghana and former of Governor, Bank of Ghana.
Ronald A. George – Maryland State Delegate
James E. Graves, Jr. – United States Court of Appeals Judge for the Fifth Circuit, formerly Mississippi Supreme Court Justice
Stanley L. Greigg – member of the U.S. House of Representatives from northwestern Iowa
David Gurfein – U.S. Marine Corps lieutenant colonel, and CEO of nonprofit organization United American Patriots
Steve Hagerty – 21st mayor of Evanston, Illinois
Arthur T. Hannett – former Governor of New Mexico
Kathy Hochul – Congresswoman, New York, Governor, New York State (’80)
John Katko – Congressman, New York
Randy Kuhl – Congressman, New York
Mordecai Lee – Wisconsin State Senator
Belva A. Lockwood – (GC) First woman to receive her party's nomination for President of the United States, and the first woman to argue a case before the US Supreme Court
Oren Lyons – Onondaga faithkeeper and global indigenous leader
William Magnarelli – New York State Assemblyman
Joanie Mahoney – Former Onondaga County Executive
Neal P. McCurn – Senior Judge for the US District Court, Northern District of New York
Theodore McKee – United States Court of Appeals Chief Judge for the Third Circuit
Rodney C. Moen – Wisconsin State Senator
Toby Moffett – Former US Congressman from Connecticut
John H. Mulroy – former Onondaga County Executive
Norman A. Mordue – Chief Judge for the US District Court, Northern District of New York
Bismarck Myrick – former US Ambassador to the Republic of Liberia and Lesotho
Sean O'Keefe – former NASA administrator
Masahide Ota – former Governor of Okinawa, Japan
John Prevas – Circuit Court Judge, City of Baltimore
Elliott Portnoy – Chairman of SNR Denton
Steven Rothman – Congressman, New Jersey
Warren Rudman – former Senator, New Hampshire
Frederick J. Scullin, Jr. – Senior Judge for the US District Court, Northern District of New York
Donna Shalala – former Secretary, US Department of Health and Human Services, US House of Representatives from Florida
Salvador del Solar – former prime minister of Peru
Glenn T. Suddaby – Justice for the US District Court, Northern District of New York
John H. Terry – former US Congressman
Sandra L. Townes – Justice for the US District Court, Eastern District of New York
Mitchel Wallerstein – former Deputy Assistant Secretary of Defense for counter-proliferation policy
Ben Walsh – 54th Mayor of Syracuse
George Warrington – NJ Transit president and former Amtrak president
David P. Weber – former Assistant Inspector General for Investigations at the US Securities and Exchange Commission
John P. White – former Deputy Secretary, US Department of Defense

Media and communications
Russ Alben – advertising executive, created the Timex tagline, "It takes a licking and keeps on ticking"
Marv Albert – sportscaster
David Amber – reporter, ESPN
Damon Amendolara – sportscaster
 Emily Barkann – White House correspondent
Michael Barkann – sportscaster, Comcast SportsNet, 94WIP Philadelphia
Len Berman – sportscaster
Matthew Berry – ESPN fantasy sports analyst
Paul Bouche – TV producer - Media Personality
Contessa Brewer – broadcast journalist, MSNBC
Samantha Brown – TV host
Steve Bunin – sportscaster, ESPN
Ryan Burr  – sportscaster, ESPN, NBC and Golf Channel
Mary Calvi – journalist, anchor at WCBS-TV, New York City
Craig Carton – Co-Host, Boomer and Carton in the Morning, WFAN NY
Joe Castiglione – Boston Red Sox radio announcer
Ernest Chappell – radio and television announcer
Dick Clark – television personality, American Bandstand, Dick Clark's New Year's Rockin' Eve
Michael Cole – WWE commentator
Ed Coleman – sportscaster, WFAN NY
Bob Costas – sportscaster, NBC Sports and MLB Network
Denise D'Ascenzo (19582019)  television news anchorwoman (WFSB-TV in Hartford, Connecticut)
Bob Dotson – journalist
Ian Eagle – sportscaster, CBS and YES
Emme – plus-size model and TV host
Susan Feeney – journalist, former senior editor for NPR
Marty Glickman – sportscaster
Jeff Glor – anchor, CBS Evening News
Daniel J. Halstead – publisher of The Syracuse Daily Union (1860), The Syracuse Daily Courier and Union (1860–1869), The Syracuse Daily Courier (1869–1888)  and The Syracuse Courier (1888–1898) newspapers
Scott Hanson – sportscaster, NFL Network, host of NFL RedZone
Vaughn Harper – radio DJ, WBLS NY 'Quiet Storm', basketball player, musician.
Ariel Helwani – MMA journalist
Deborah Henretta, senior advisor, SSA & Company; retired group president, Procter & Gamble
Larry Hryb – Xbox Live Director of Programming
Avery Yale Kamila – vegan food columnist, Portland Press Herald
Megyn Kelly – news anchor, Fox News Channel
Ted Koppel – broadcast journalist, "Nightline"
Larry Kramer – President and Publisher of USA Today
Steve Kroft – co-editor and news correspondent, "60 Minutes"
Michael Kranish – journalist
Harold E. Martin – Pulitzer Prize-winning newspaperman, Montgomery, Alabama Advertiser
Mike McAlary – Pulitzer Prize-winning journalist
Sean McDonough – sportscaster, ESPN
Joe McNally – photographer
Jeanne Moos – news correspondent, CNN 
Will Murray – researcher and segment producer, The Howard Stern Show
Akshay Nanavati – USMC, author of Fearvana
Jim Naughtie – British journalist and radio presenter
Diane Nelson – President of DC Entertainment 
Bob Neumeier – sportscaster, NBC
Donald Newhouse – president, Advance Publications
S.I. Newhouse, Jr. – Chairman & CEO, Advance Publications/ Chairman, Conde Nast Publications
Jeff Passan – baseball journalist, ESPN
Greg Papa – sportscaster, Oakland Raiders
Dave Pasch – sportscaster, ESPN
Henry Jarvis Raymond – (GWS), Founder of the New York Times
Dave Roberts – weatherman, broadcaster and presenter, WPVI-TV
Sam Roberts (radio personality) – broadcaster, SiriusXM - Jim Norton & Sam Roberts, WWE
Dan Roche – sportscaster, WBZ-TV, Boston, MA
Harry M. Rosenfeld – former editor, "Washington Post"
Dave Ryan – sportscaster, ESPN
Robert Scheer – editor-in-chief, TruthDig, former managing editor Ramparts, Professor, USC Annenberg School for Communication and Journalism 
Adam Schein – SNY, Sirius XM Satellite radio NFL
Bob Shannon – radio DJ/Announcer, CBS-FM New York
Arun Shourie – Padma Bhushan recipient, World Bank Economist, former editor of Times of India and Indian Express
Anish Shroff – ESPNews anchor
Andrew Siciliano – sportscaster, NFL Network, host of DirecTV Red Zone Channel
Fred Silverman – former president, NBC
Lakshmi Singh – newscaster, journalist, NPR
Jayson Stark – journalist, sportscaster, ESPN
Dick Stockton – sportscaster
John Sykes – President of iHeartMedia Entertainment Enterprises
Mike Tirico – sportscaster, NBC
Nick Wright – TV host, radio talk show, Fox Sports 1
Justin Robert Young – podcaster, journalist, comedian and writer
Adam Zucker – sportscaster/anchor, CBS Sports Network

Science, engineering, innovation, medicine, and exploration

Joseph A. Ahearn – Civil Engineer of the U.S. Air Force; member of the National Academy of Engineering.
Ishfaq Ahmad – Professor of Computer Science
Betty Lise Anderson – Professor of Optical Science
Albert Baez – developer of the X-ray reflection microscope, physics educator, and father of Joan Baez.
John Boardman – physics educator, social activist, and gaming authority.
Daniela Bortoletto – experimental particle physicist, Nicholas Kurti Senior Research Fellow at Oxford University. 
Charles F. Brannock – inventor and manufacturer; inventor of the Brannock Device.
Rubin Braunstein – semiconductor physics, pioneer of LEDs.
Penny Budoff – physician and medical researcher; author of No More Hot Flashes and Even More Good News.
Marilyn Burns; mathematics educator and the author of over a dozen children's books on mathematics.
George Campbell Jr. – theoretical physicist who served as the eleventh president of Cooper Union.
Eileen Collins – NASA astronaut and first female Space Shuttle commander.
Alice Carter Cook – botanist and writer, first woman PhD in botany from an American university 
Tesfaye Dinka – Industrial Engineer and Prime Minister of Ethiopia from April to June 1991.
Nina Fedoroff – geneticist and molecular biologist; Science and Technology Adviser to the Secretary of State. Recipient of the National Medal of Science in 2007; member of the National Academy of Sciences.
Joan Feynman – astrophysicist, younger sister of physicist Richard Feynman.
Robert Finn – mathematician and professor.
Edith M. Flanigen – chemist and inventor; winner of the 2014 National Medal of Technology and Innovation.
George E. Fox – biologist and chemical engineer; co-discoverer of the Archaea kingdom of organisms.
Jean Fréchet – chemist and professor emeritus at the University of California, Berkeley.
Barry Gingell – internist, nutritionist, computer scientist and AIDS activist.
Joshua N. Goldberg – pioneering researcher in general relativity, professor emeritus at Syracuse University.
Gabriela González – former spokesperson for the LIGO Scientific Collaboration. Winner of the National Academy of Sciences Award for Scientific Discovery (2017); member of the National Academy of Sciences.
Hermann Gummel – semiconductor device physicist; member of the National Academy of Engineering.
 – particle physicist, neuroscientist, and author. 
John J. Hopfield – spectroscopist and discoverer of the Hopfield bands of molecular oxygen (O2).
Robert Jarvik – inventor of the first permanently implantable artificial heart
Hongxing Jiang – semiconductor physicist.
Joel Lebowitz – statistical physicist; member of the National Academy of Sciences
Jingyu Lin – semiconductor physicist.
Gilles Martin – French engineer, founder and executive chairman of Eurofins Scientific.
William Ralph Maxon – botanist and pteridologist.
Evangelia Micheli-Tzanakou – pioneer in neuroelectric systems and biomedical engineering education.
Pericles A. Mitkas – computer scientist and Rector of the Aristotle University of Thessaloniki.
Story Musgrave – NASA astronaut.
V. Parmeswaran Nair – theoretical particle physicist, Distinguished Professor at the City University of New York.
Ezra T. Newman – theoretical physicist, winner of the 2011 Einstein Prize.
Joy Osofsky – clinical and developmental psychologist, professor of clinical psychology and psychiatry, psychoanalyst
Yude Pan – forest ecologist. 
Martin A. Pomerantz – astrophysicist, president emeritus of the Bartol Research Institute, and pioneer of Antarctic astronomy.
Pierre Ramond – string theorist; winner of the 2004 Oskar Klein Medal.
Harry Frederick Recher – ornithologist; winner of the 1994 D.L. Serventy Medal.
Mark Reed – nanotechnology pioneer, Harold Hodgkinson Chair at Yale University.
Elsa Reichmanis – optical and electronic materials; member of the National Academy of Engineering; 2001 recipient of the Perkin Medal.
Karin Rodland – cancer cell biologist; Fellow of the American Association for the Advancement of Science; Laboratory Fellow of the U.S. Pacific Northwest National Laboratory.
Charles Rosen – robotics; co-founder of Ridge Vineyards.
Joel Rosenbaum – cell biologist; winner of the E. B. Wilson Medal.
Rainer K. Sachs – theoretical astrophysicist, co-discoverer of the Sachs–Wolfe effect.
Pantur Silaban – prominent Indonesian theoretical physicist. 
Michael Streicher – developer of stainless steels; winner of the W. R. Whitney Award.
Sultan bin Salman – first Arab, first Muslim and the youngest person to travel to space.
Salvatore Torquato – theoretical scientist who does research at the interface of physics, chemistry, and engineering.
José W. F. Valle – Brazilian-Spanish theoretical physicist noted for work on the mass of neutrinos.
James Tour – organic chemist and nanotechnologist.
Clarence Abiathar Waldo – mathematician and educator known for his role in the 1897 Indiana Pi Bill affair.
Sigi Ziering – industrial physicist, businessman, and philanthropist.

Sports

Will Allen – football player
Doc Alexander – football player and coach
Gary Anderson – football player, former NFL record holder
Carmelo Anthony – basketball player, Portland Trail Blazers
Julie Archoska – football player
Michael Carter-Williams – basketball player, Orlando Magic
Art Baker – football player
John Barsha – football player
Mathieu Beaudoin – football player
Dave Bing – basketball player, current mayor of Detroit, Michigan
Jim Boeheim – basketball player and coach, Syracuse University, member of the National Basketball Hall of Fame
Nathan Bombrys – Managing Director of the Glasgow Warriors, a professional Scottish rugby union club
Jim Brown – football player, lacrosse player, actor, member of the Pro Football Hall of Fame
Keith Bulluck – football player
Rob Burnett – football player
Delone Carter – football player
Irv Constantine – football player
Derrick Coleman – basketball player 
Trevor Cooney – pro basketball player 
Rakeem Christmas – basketball player
DaJuan Coleman – basketball player, free agent
John Coleman – baseball player
Jim Collins – football player
Tom Coughlin – VP football operations, Jacksonville Jaguars
Larry Csonka – football player
Donovin Darius – football player
Al Davis – NFL owner
Ernie Davis – football player, Heisman Trophy winner
John Desko – lacrosse coach
Riley Dixon – NFL punter
Sherman Douglas – basketball player
Dennis DuVal – basketball player
Randy Edsall – college football coach
Joe Ehrmann – football player 
Tyler Ennis—basketball player
David Falk – founder, SFX Basketball Group
Jonny Flynn – basketball player
Dwight Freeney – football player
Jim Frugone – football player
Gary Gait – lacrosse player
Paul Gait – lacrosse player
Jonah Goldman – MLB baseball player
Jerami Grant – pro basketball player, Detroit Pistons
Michael Gbinije — pro basketball player
Donté Greene – pro basketball player
Tim Green – football player
Morlon Greenwood – football player
Marvin Harrison – football player
Jason Hart – basketball player
Qadry Ismail – football player
Tanard Jackson – football player
Paul Jappe – football player
Arthur Jones – football player; currently competing for the NFL on the Colts
Chandler Jones – football player; currently playing for the Cardinals 
Tebucky Jones – football player
Wesley Johnson – basketball player
Daryl Johnston – football player
Dwayne Joseph – football player
Kris Joseph – basketball player, Brooklyn Nets
Mark Kerr – NCAA Wrestling Champion; retired MMA fighter; 2-time UFC Heavyweight Tournament Winner
Rob Konrad – football player
Jim Konstanty – major league baseball pitcher
Floyd Little – football player, Pro Football Hall of Fame 
Tyler Lydon – basketball player, Denver Nuggets
John Mackey – former NFL tight end, has college award named after him
Olindo Mare – football player, Carolina Panthers
Doug Marrone – football coach
Frank Matteo – football player
Donovan McNabb – football player, Free Agent
Gerry McNamara – basketball player
Don McPherson – football player
Dave Meggyesy – football player
Fab Melo – basketball player 
Chris McCullough—basketball player
Eddie Miller – basketball player
Art Monk – football player; NFL Hall of Fame inductee
Tim Moresco – football player
Joe Morris – football player
Larry Morris – football player
Lawrence Moten – basketball player
Tom Myers – football player
Jim Nance – football player
Ryan Nassib – football player, New York Giants
Doc Oberlander – former baseball player
Henry Obst – football player
Louis Orr – basketball player
Billy Owens – basketball player
Markus Paul – football player
Greg Paulus – football player and former Duke University basketball player
Scott Pioli – NFL executive
Casey Powell – lacrosse player
Mikey Powell – lacrosse player
Ryan Powell – lacrosse player
Myer Prinstein – Olympic medalist
Andy Rautins – basketball player
Jim Ridlon – former professional football player and renowned sports painter and sculptor
Jim Ringo – football player
Victor Ross – lacrosse player 
Malachi Richardson—basketball player
Mike Rotunda – professional wrestler
Greg Sankey – Commissioner, Southeastern Conference
Danny Schayes – basketball player
Gerhard Schwedes – football player
Scott Schwedes – football player
Sam Sebo – football player
Rony Seikaly – basketball player
Wilmeth Sidat-Singh – football and basketball player
Kaseem Sinceno – football player
Walt Singer – football player
Anthony Smith – football player
Walt Sweeney – football player
Kathrine Switzer – marathon runner
Etan Thomas – basketball player
Shamarko Thomas – football player
David Tyree – football player
Dion Waiters – basketball player
John Wallace – basketball player
Stan Walters – football player
Hakim Warrick – basketball player, Phoenix Suns
Dwayne Washington – basketball player
Otis Wilson – football player
Ray Witter – football player
Paul Young – Jamaican soccer player/manager
Katie Zaferes – triathlete

Entertainment and performing arts

Elfriede Abbe – sculptor
Lynn Ahrens – musical theatre lyricist
Martin Bandier – chairman and CEO of Sony/ATV
Darryl Bell – actor
Craig Borten – screenwriter
Paul Bouche – TV Host "A Oscuras Pero Encendidos'; television producer
Eric Bress – film director and screenwriter
Tim Calpin – screenwriter
Warren Casey – writer, lyricist, screenwriter
Felix Cavaliere – singer with The Rascals
Priscilla Chan – singer
Clairo – singer-songwriter
Dick Clark – host of American Bandstand; television producer
Ken Goldstein – musician known as "Jack Dempsey"; author
John Curran – film director and screenwriter
Doug Davis – entertainment lawyer and Grammy Award-winning producer
Taye Diggs – actor
Heather Dubrow – actress; cast member on The Real Housewives of Orange County
Zach Tyler Eisen – voice actor; voice of Aang on Avatar: The Last Airbender 
Peter Falk – actor
Gary Farmer – actor
Vera Farmiga – actress
Wally Feresten – cue card supervisor for Saturday Night Live
Judy Freudberg – screenwriter
Jami Gong – stand-up comedian
Carl Gottlieb – screenwriter; vice-president of the Writers Guild of America, West
Peter Guber –  CEO of Mandalay Entertainment and Co-owner of the Golden State Warriors
Dan Gurewitch – writer
Jay Harrington – actor
Elizabeth Hendrickson – actress
Bob Holz – musician
Miriam Hopkins – actress
Garland Jeffreys – musician
Miss Jones – radio DJ and singer
Irma Kalish – television writer
Joe Klotz – film editor
Lisa Lampanelli – comedian
Frank Langella – actor Frost/Nixon
Meg LeFauve – screenwriter Inside Out (2015 film), Captain Marvel (film)
Sheldon Leonard – film and television actor, producer, director, and writer
Riki Lindhome – actress
Sam Lloyd – actor, musician
Frank Marion – motion picture pioneer
Andy Mineo – rapper, singer, producer, director, actor and minister
Neal McDonough – actor
Sterling Morrison – musician
Jessie Mueller – Tony-winning actress
Suzanne Pleshette – actress
Mike Pollock – voice actor
Lou Reed – musician
Kevin Michael Richardson – actor
Sam Roberts – radio broadcaster
Doug Robinson – television producer
Maria Sansone – television presenter
Ken Schretzmann – film editor
Reid Scott – actor
Tom Everett Scott – actor
Aaron Sorkin – Emmy- and Academy Award-winning screenwriter A Few Good Men, The Social Network, The West Wing, Moneyball
Lexington Steele – actor, director, and owner of Mercenary Motion Pictures and Black Viking Pictures Inc.
Jerry Stiller – actor
Habib Tabani – Pakistani ghazal singer and industrialist
Arielle Tepper – Broadway producer
Mark Tinker – television producer/director
Stephen A. Unger – executive recruiter, media and entertainment business
Jimmy Van Heusen – Academy Award-winning composer
Bill Viola – video artist
Michael H. Weber – screenwriter (500) Days of Summer, The Spectacular Now, The Fault in Our Stars, Paper Towns
Peter Weller – actor
Vanessa Williams – singer-songwriter, actress, dancer, Miss America
Pete Yorn – musician

Fictional characters
Rachel Green – protagonist of hit sitcom Friends
 Winston Schmidt – protagonist of hit sitcom New Girl
 Nick Miller – protagonist of hit sitcom New Girl
 Winston Bishop – protagonist of hit sitcom New Girl
 Patrick Warburton – protagonist of hit sitcom Rules of Engagement (TV series)
 Terry Jeffords – revealed on Brooklyn Nine-Nine to have played football while attending Syracuse University

Other 
Alexandra Curtis – Miss Rhode Island 2015
Jane Dempsey Douglass – feminist theologian, ecclesiastical historian, and president of the World Alliance of Reformed Churches
Marc S. Ellenbogen – diplomat, philanthropist, President, Prague Society for International Cooperation
Borys Gudziak – Catholic Bishop, Metropolitan-Archbishop of Philadelphia (Ukrainian Greek Catholic) 
Michael Yeung Ming-cheung – Catholic Bishop, eighth Bishop of the Roman Catholic Diocese of Hong Kong
John Zogby – pollster, Zogby International
Neilia Hunter Biden – teacher, first wife of Joe Biden

Notable educators 

William Alston – philosopher.
Julia Alvarez –  poet, novelist, and essayist.
Richard Arnowitt – theoretical physicist.
Donna Arzt – attorney and legal scholar.
Abhay Ashtekar – theoretical physicist and creator of the Ashtekar variables for quantum gravity; member of the U.S. National Academy of Sciences.
Ernst Bacon – prolific composer.
A. P. Balachandran – theoretical particle physicist.
Peter Bergmann – won the Einstein Prize for research on quantum gravity.
Catherine Bertini – United Nations under-secretary-general, winner of the 2003 World Food Prize. 
Raymond Thayer Birge - physicist, subsequent president of the American Physical Society and chair of the University of California, Berkeley physics department.
Howard Boatwright – Music School dean.
Philip Booth – poet.
Mark Bowick – theoretical physicist noted for work in particle physics and condensed matter physics.
Zachary Braiterman – philosopher and religious studies scholar.
Arthur C. Brooks
Lori Brown – architect and associate professor.
Horace Campbell – Department of African American Studies and Department of Political Science.
Simon Catterall – theoretical physicist specializing in elementary particles.
Massimo Carmassi – architect.
Bill Cole – musician, author (Department of African American Studies)
Raymond Carver – short story writer.
David Crane – former Chief Prosecutor for Special Court of the Sierra Leone
Junot Diaz – writer
Geoffrey C. Fox – theoretical physicist and computer scientist.
Tess Gallagher - poet, essayist, short story writer.
Joshua N. Goldberg – theoretical physicist noted for work on general relativity.
John Langston Gwaltney – African American professor of anthropology, author of Drylongso: A Self Portrait of Black America.
Per Brinch Hansen – computer scientist.
Douglas Holtz-Eakin – former Director of the U.S. Congressional Budget Office (2003–2005), and chief economic policy adviser to U.S. Senator John McCain's 2008 presidential campaign.
Henry Kandrup – theoretical astrophysicist.
Mary Karr – writer and poet.
Bruce Kingma – economist and academic entrepreneur
Arthur Komar – theoretical physicist.
Louis Krasner - violinist.
Edgar Lane – Professor of political science
Melvin Lax – theoretical physicist and member of the National Academy of Sciences
Cristina Marchetti – theoretical physicist specializing in soft condensed matter physics; member of the U.S. National Academy of Sciences.
Donald Marolf – theoretical physicist who has worked on quantum gravity and relativity.
Roscoe C. Martin (1903–1972) – Professor of Political Science at Syracuse University from 1949 to 1972.
Janis Mayes – author, literary critic.
Daniel Patrick Moynihan – Senator from New York, political scientist.
Ivan Meštrović – sculptor and artist.
Micere Mugo – poet and playwright (Department of African American Studies, Department of Literature).
Ei-ichi Negishi – chemist, winner of the 2010 Nobel Prize.
Romita Ray – art historian
Fritz Rohrlich – theoretical physicist, pioneer of quantum electrodynamics.
Alexander Rosenberg – philosopher and novelist
Peter Saulson – experimental physicist noted for work on gravitational wave astronomy.
George Saunders – writer.
Milton Sernett – historian, author (Department of African American Studies, Department of History)
Delmore Schwartz – poet.
Harry Schwartz – Soviet specialist, The New York Times editorial writer
Huston Smith – religious studies scholar.
Lee Smolin – theoretical physicist noted for work on quantum gravity.
Rafael Sorkin – theoretical physicist noted for work on quantum gravity.
Sheldon Stone - elementary particle physicist, winner of the Panofsky Prize
Eileen Strempel – soprano, Associate Dean of Graduate Studies, Associate Professor of Fine Arts.
George Sudarshan – theoretical physicist, winner of the Dirac Prize.
Robert Thompson – media historian.
Mark Trodden – theoretical cosmologist.
Douglas Unger – novelist.
Gabriel Vahanian – theologian, noted figure in the Death of God movement in 1960s.
Peter Van Inwagen – philosopher
Kameshwar C. Wali – theoretical physicist, author.
Johan Wiklund – Entrepreneurship professor and the Al Berg Chair at the Whitman School.
Frances Willard – 19th century educator, temperance reformer, and women's suffragist.
Tobias Wolff – writer.

Notable commencement speakers and honored guests
2022 – David Muir, Journalist and the anchor of ABC World News Tonight
2020 – Kathy Hochul, Congresswoman, New York, Governor, New York State (’80)
2018 – Mary C. Daly, Economist and President San Francisco Fed
2018 – Kathrine Switzer, Athlete, Author and Activist (’68, G’72)
2017 – Vernon Jordan, African-American Lawyer, Business Executive, and Civil Rights Activist
2016 – Donald Newhouse, President, Advance Publications
2015 – Mary Karr, Poet and Essayist
2014 – David Remnick, Editor-in-Chief, New Yorker
2013 – Nicholas Kristof, New York Times Columnist
2012 − Aaron Sorkin, American screenwriter, producer, and playwright
2011 – J. Craig Venter, American biologist and entrepreneur, President of J. Craig Venter Institute
2010 – Jamie Dimon, CEO JPMorgan Chase & Co.
2009 – Joseph R. Biden Jr., Vice President of the United States of America
2008 – Bob Woodruff, ABC News journalist
2007 – Frank McCourt, author/Pulitzer Prize winner
2006 – Billy Joel, composer and singer
2005 – Jane Goodall, primatologist, ethologist and anthropologist
2004 – Phylicia Rashad, actress
2003 – Bill Clinton, former U.S. president, 1993–2001
2002 – Rudolph Giuliani, former Mayor of New York City, 1994–2001
2001 – Eileen Collins, American astronaut
2000 – Ted Koppel, American journalist
1999 – Charles Schumer, U.S. Senator (D-NY), 1999–present
1998 – Robert Fulghum, author, essayist
1996 – Steve Kroft, journalist, long-time correspondent60 Minutes
1995 – Donna Shalala, Secretary of Health and Human Services, 1993–2001
1994 – Kurt Vonnegut, novelist
1990 – William Safire, journalist
1989 – Daniel Patrick Moynihan, U.S. Senator (D-NY)
1988 – Malcolm Forbes, publisher of the Forbes magazine
1986 – Mario Cuomo, Governor of New York
1983 – Daniel Boorstin, Director, Library of Congress 
1982 – Ted Koppel, journalist
1981 – Alexander Haig, U.S. Secretary of State, 1981–1982
1980 – Bill Moyers, journalist
1979 – Tom Brokaw, journalist
1978 – William Safire, journalist
1973 – Edward M. Kennedy, U.S. Senator (D-MA), 1962–2009
1969 – William F. Buckley, journalist
1968 – Walter Cronkite, journalist
1966 – Nelson Rockefeller, Governor of New York, 1959–1973
1965 – Robert F. Kennedy, U.S. Senator (D-NY), 1965–1968
1964 – Lyndon B. Johnson, then U.S. President
1961 – Ayn Rand, novelist
1960 – Harry S. Truman, former U.S. president, 1945–1953
1959 – Robert Frost, poet
1957 – John F. Kennedy, U.S. Senator (D-MA), 1953–1960
1937 – Herbert Hoover, former U.S. president, 1929–1933
1930 – Franklin D. Roosevelt, Governor of New York, 1928–1932

See also
Chancellor of Syracuse University

References

Syracuse University people
People
Syracuse